Negopenia is a monotypic genus of tropical land snails with an operculum. It is a genus of terrestrial gastropod mollusks in the subfamily Helicininae of the family Helicinidae.

Species
 Negopenia leucostoma (Tapparone Canefri, 1883)

References

External links
 Iredale, T. (1941). A basic list of the land Mollusca of Papua. The Australian Zoologist. 10(1): 51-94, pls. 3-4

Helicinidae

Gastropod genera